The Curraheen River (also spelled Curragheen) is a river in County Cork and Cork City, Ireland.

Name
The river's name is in reference to the Curragheen townland (Inniskenny civil parish). In the Irish language, the river bears the name An tSabhrainn, from the Proto-Celtic *Sabrinā, the same name as the Hafren and the River Severn. It is named, as Sabraind, in the 12th century poem Aislinge Meic Con Glinne, although some scholars translate this as "River Lee."

Course
The Curraheen River rises at the confluence of several rivulets in the Ballincollig–Curragheen area. It flows north and then east, under the N22 and N40 roads, flowing past Curraheen Park Greyhound Stadium. In Bishopstown it turns northwards, flowing to the west of Cork IT's campus. It flows under the Model Farm Road (R608) and then bends eastwards, where there is a river walk. The Curraheen River then flows under the R608 at Victoria Cross and drains into the River Lee to the southwest of Cork City.

Wildlife

Fish species include brown trout, Atlantic salmon, European river lamprey and European brook lamprey.

There was a major fish kill of brown trout on the Curraheen River in 2016, due to a sewage leak.

An invasive American rodent, the coypu, has been spotted on the Curraheen River from 2016 onward.

References

See also
Rivers of Ireland

Rivers of County Cork
River Lee